Der Ziegelbrenner ("The Brick Burner") was an anarchist magazine published by Ret Marut, in Munich and Cologne, from 1917 to 1921.

History 
The first issue of Der Ziegelbrenner was published on 1 September 1917. Ret Marut, was responsible for its publication, editing and content. The last of its 13 issues appeared on 21 December 1921.

According to Oskar Maria Graf, Der Ziegelbrenner escaped censorship because the authorities misclassified the publication as a "bricklayer magazine".

References

Further reading

External links 
Der Ziegelbrenner at The Internet Archive

1917 establishments in Germany
1921 disestablishments in Germany
Anarchist periodicals published in Germany
Defunct political magazines published in Germany
Magazines established in 1917
Magazines disestablished in 1921
Magazines published in Munich
Mass media in Cologne